Burghaslach is a municipality and a market town in the district of Neustadt (Aisch)-Bad Windsheim in Franconia in Bavaria, Germany.

Geography 

Neighbouring municipalities to Burghaslach are Geiselwind, Schlüsselfeld, Vestenbergsgreuth, Markt Taschendorf, Scheinfeld and Oberscheinfeld.

Geographical Location 
Burghaslach is between Würzburg and Nürnberg. It is accessible by slip road 77 of the Bundesautobahn 3

Districts 
The municipality is composed of 16 districts: 
 Breitenlohe
 Buchbach
 Buchmühle
 Burghaslach
 Burghöchstadt
 Freihaslach
 Fürstenforst
 Gleißenberg
 Hardhof
 Kirchrimbach
 Münchhof
 Niederndorf
 Oberrimbach
 Rosenbirkach
 Seitenbuch
 Unterrimbach

Placename 
The name Burghaslach is derived from the German Burg what means castle and Haslach, a local river.

History 
Burghaslach was independent from 1136.

In 1806, Burghaslach became a part of the Kingdom of Bavaria.

Politic 
The mayor of Burghaslach is Armin Luther, in office since 2014 and re-elected in 2020.

Council 

The membership of the council is distributed as follows:

Economy and infrastructure

Traffic 
The market is near the Bundesautobahn 3 Würzburg - Nürnberg slip road 77 Schlüsselfeld.

The ADAC declared the truck stop at Burghaslach as the winner of the 2008 European Service Area Competition. The truck stop was rated "very good" in five of nine categories. Among a total of 65 checked service areas in Germany, Austria, Italy, France and Switzerland the truck stop at Burghaslach came in first.

References 

Neustadt (Aisch)-Bad Windsheim